Jehangoo Amin (born 1917) was an Indian cyclist. He competed in the team pursuit event at the 1948 Summer Olympics.

References

External links
 

1917 births
Possibly living people
Indian male cyclists
Olympic cyclists of India
Cyclists at the 1948 Summer Olympics
Place of birth missing
Date of birth missing
Parsi people